In organometallic chemistry, bent metallocenes are a subset of metallocenes. In bent metallocenes, the ring systems coordinated to the metal are not parallel, but are tilted at an angle.  A common example of a bent metallocene is Cp2TiCl2.  Several reagents and much research is based on bent metallocenes.

Synthesis
Like regular metallocenes, bent metallocenes are synthesized by a variety of methods but most typically by reaction of sodium cyclopentadienide with the metal halide.  This method applies to the synthesis of the bent metallocene dihalides of titanium, zirconium, hafnium, and vanadium:
2 NaC5H5  +  TiCl4   →   (C5H5)2TiCl2  +  2 NaCl
In the earliest work in this area, Grignard reagents were used to deprotonate the cyclopentadiene.

Niobocene dichloride, featuring Nb(IV), is prepared via a multistep reaction that begins with a Nb(V) precursor:
NbCl5 + 6 NaC5H5   →   5 NaCl + (C5H5)4Nb + organic products
(C5H5)4Nb  +  2 HCl  + 0.5 O2)    →     [{C5H5)2NbCl}2O]Cl2  +  2 C5H6
2 HCl  +  [{(C5H5)2NbCl}2O]Cl2  +  SnCl2   →   2 (C5H5)2NbCl2  +  SnCl4  +  H2O
Bent metallocene dichlorides of molybdenum and tungsten are also prepared via indirect routes that involve redox at the metal centres.

Structure and bonding
Bent metallocenes have idealized C2v symmetry.  The non-Cp ligands are arrayed in the wedge area.  For bent metallocenes with the formula Cp2ML2, the L-M-L angle depends on the electron count.  In the d2-complex molybdocene dichloride (Cp2MoCl2) the Cl-Mo-Cl angle is 82°.  In the d1 complex niobocene dichloride, this angle is more open at 85.6°. In the d0-complex zirconocene dichloride the angle is even more open at 92.1°.  This trend reveals that the frontier orbital, which is dz2, is oriented in the MCl2 plane but does not bisect the MCl2 angle.

Reactivity

Salt metathesis reactions
Since bent metallocenes typically have other ligands, often halides, these additional sites are centers of reactivity.  For example, reduction of zirconocene dichloride gives the corresponding hydrido chloride called Schwartz's reagent:
(C5H5)2ZrCl2 + 1/4 LiAlH4 → (C5H5)2ZrHCl  + 1/4 "LiAlCl4"
This hydride reagent is useful for organic synthesis.  Related titanium-based complexes Petasis reagent and Tebbe's reagent also feature bent metallocenes.  Titanocene pentasulfide is used in research on polysulfur rings.  Alkyne and benzyne derivatives of titanocene are reagents in organic synthesis.

Reactions of Cp rings
Although the Cp ligands are generally safely considered spectator ligands, they are not completely inert.  For example, attempts to prepare titanocene by reduction of titanocene dichloride affords complexes of fulvalene ligands.

Bent metallocenes derived from pentamethylcyclopentadiene can undergo reactions involving the methyl groups.  For example, decamethyltungstocene dihydride undergoes dehydrogenation to give the tuck-in complex.

The original example proceeded via sequential loss of two equivalents of H2 from decamethyltungstocene dihydride, Cp*2WH2.  The first dehydrogenation step affords a simple tuck-in complex: 
(C5Me5)2WH2  →   (C5Me5)(C5Me3(CH2)2)W +  2 H2

Redox
When the non-Cp ligands are halides, these complexes undergo reduction to give carbonyl, alkene, and alkyne complexes that are useful reagents.  A well-known example is titanocene dicarbonyl:
Cp2TiCl2  +  Mg  +  2 CO    →    Cp2Ti(CO)2  +  MgCl2
Reduction of vanadocene dichloride gives vanadocene.

Olefin polymerization catalysis
Although bent metallocenes are of no commercial value as olefin polymerization catalysts, studies on these compounds were highly influential on the industrial processes. Already in 1957 there were reports on the polymerization of ethylene using a catalyst prepared from Cp2TiCl2 and trimethyl aluminium. Reactions involving the related Cp2Zr2Cl2/Al(CH3)3 system revealed the beneficial effects of trace amounts of water for ethylene polymerization.  It is now known that the partially hydrolyzed organoaluminium reagent methylaluminoxane ("MAO") gives rise to families of highly active catalysts.  Work in this are led to constrained geometry complexes, which are not bent metallocenes, but exhibit related structural features.

References

Further reading
,
.

Metallocenes
Catalysts